The Dos Porcos River is in the Bahia state of eastern Brazil.

See also
List of rivers of Bahia

References
Brazilian Ministry of Transport

Rivers of Bahia